Peter Bailey may refer to:
A. Peter Bailey (born 1938), American journalist, author, and lecturer
Peter Bailey (cricketer) (born 1939), Australian cricketer
Peter Hamilton Bailey (born 1927), Australian public servant and academic
Peter James Bailey III (1812–1836), soldier and eponym of Bailey County, Texas
Peter Bailey, a character in It's a Wonderful Life

See also

Peter Bayley (disambiguation)
Peter Baillie (1771–1811), British merchant